His Honor, Homer Bell is a half-hour filmed American sitcom series made by NBC Films for first-run syndication. It starred Gene Lockhart in the title role. Thirty-nine episodes were produced by NBC in 1955. The first station that aired the series was KCOP-TV in Los Angeles, starting February 24, 1955. Station WJAC-TV in Johnstown, Pennsylvania was still running it as late as January 1961.

Premise
Homer Bell (Gene Lockhart) is both an elected judge and a practising attorney in midwestern Spring City.  He is a middle-aged widower, who is guardian to his orphaned niece, fifteen year-old Cassandra "Casey" Bell (Mary Lee Dearring). They are both looked after by the housekeeper-cook Maude (Jane Moultrie). Casey is a tomboy whose efforts to help her uncle often backfire. Maude is a superb cook, who is often recruited to change employers. Homer Bell, well regarded by his constituents, nevertheless finds himself landing in situations which might compromise their good will. He also can't resist helping anyone who seeks his aid.

Production
Despite its supposed midwestern setting, the series was produced by Galahad Productions at the NBC Films studio in Brooklyn. Himan Brown was the producer for Galahad; he also directed some episodes. Other directors included Derwin Abbe and Will Price. There was no pilot episode as such, since NBC produced it for syndication. The show started filming in late 1954; by mid-January 1955 NBC felt confident enough to advertise the 39 episode package of shows in a trade paper. Midwood High School in Brooklyn was used for exterior shots of the Spring City courthouse.

Reception
There was very little critical response to this show, not unusual for a syndicated series without a major star. Critic Allen Rich said it was "much ado about nothing".

Broadcast history
The first episode broadcast was on Thursday, February 24, 1955, by KCOP-TV in Los Angeles. The initial sponsor at KCOP-TV and other West Coast cities was the Union Pacific Railroad. Within a month, stations in Nebraska, Texas, Oregon, and Washington had started showing it. Since it was syndicated, stations ran it on different days of the week, and at various times, usually before or after network programming in the evening. Since there was no continuity between episodes, stations ran them in whichever sequence suited them.

Episodes
For clarity, "Original Air Date" is based on the first major broadcaster of the series, KCOP Channel 13 in Los Angeles. Episode titles and summaries are accurate where given but  incomplete, and possibly out of original air date sequence. Cast lists are unknown save for one episode.

Notes

References

1950s American sitcoms
1955 American television series debuts
1955 American television series endings
First-run syndicated television programs in the United States